Kim Chi-gon (born 29 July 1983) is a South Korean football former player who last plays as a defender for Sarawak in Malaysia Premier League.

He was part of the South Korea football team in 2004 Olympic, who finished second in Group A, making it through to the next round, before being defeated by silver medal winners Paraguay. He also capped for South Korea U-20 football team at 2003 FIFA World Youth Championship.

Club career statistics

Honours

FC Seoul 
2002 Asian Club Championship Runners-up
2006 League Cup Champion
2007 League Cup Runners-up
2008 K-League Runners-up

References

External links
 
 Kim Chi-gon – National Team Stats at KFA 
 
 

1983 births
Living people
Association football defenders
South Korean footballers
South Korea international footballers
FC Seoul players
Ulsan Hyundai FC players
Gimcheon Sangmu FC players
K League 1 players
Footballers at the 2004 Summer Olympics
2007 AFC Asian Cup players
Olympic footballers of South Korea
Sportspeople from Busan
Footballers at the 2006 Asian Games
Asian Games competitors for South Korea